Kurtis Loder (born May 5, 1945) is an American entertainment critic, author, columnist, and television personality. He served in the 1980s as editor at Rolling Stone, during a tenure that Reason later called "legendary". He has contributed to articles in Reason, Esquire, Details, New York, and Time. He has also made cameos on several films and television series. He is best known for his role at MTV News since the 1980s and for appearing in other MTV-related television specials. He has hosted the SiriusXM radio show True Stories since 2016.

Early life
Loder was born in Ocean City, New Jersey. He graduated from Ocean City High School in 1963. He spent two years in college "and just hated it." He was drafted into the United States Army and joined its journalism school.

Career
Loder stated that he "just fell into" his field, elaborating that his "entire journalism background is four weeks... That's it. Nothing else. You can learn journalism in four weeks. It's not an overcomplicated thing. It's very simple."

Loder lived in Europe for the next several years, doing what he later called "scandal sheet" "yellow journalism." He returned home to New Jersey at the end of 1972 and worked with a local newspaper and then an Ocean City-based magazine run by the sister of the city's famous writer Gay Talese. He left in the summer of 1976 to work with a free Long Island rock weekly called Good Times. He received about $200 a week.

After meeting a fellow "music geek," David Fricke, "the two of us began driving into Manhattan virtually every night to wallow in the flourishing punk rock scene at CBGB's, Max's, etc. This was, fortunately, cool with the wives. I mean, we'd still be sitting upright at four in the morning through fist fights, mass nod-outs, and sets by bands with names like Blinding Headache, played to audiences of three people, of which we'd be two-thirds. I don't think I can quite convey how great days those were".

They both joined Circus in 1978 and moved to Manhattan. Loder went on to become one of its official editors. The staff had a fun, relaxed atmosphere and considered the magazine to be second or third tier. Loder later said that "Whatever was said to be 'happening' in commercial pop music was... on the cover of Circus. Disco? Run with it. Shirtless teen popsters? Put 'em on the cover... a, shall we say, ardent enthusiasm for pix of nubile youths. Metal, of course, was really the mag's meat." He also remarked that "it was a foregone conclusion that writing of any technical ambition, about new acts of any real excitement or interest, would make it in the mag only by the sheerest accident."  

Loder started a nine-year run at Rolling Stone in May 1979. RockCritics.com has called him "one of Rolling Stone'''s most talented and prolific feature writers." While at Rolling Stone, Loder co-authored singer Tina Turner's 1986 autobiography I, Tina. He then contributed to the screenplay adaptation for the film What's Love Got to Do with It.

Loder joined MTV in 1987 as the host of their flagship music news program, The Week in Rock. It was later expanded and renamed to MTV News in which he was an anchor and correspondent. Loder was one of the first to break the news of Kurt Cobain's death; he interrupted regular programming to inform viewers that Cobain was found dead.<ref>Karas, Matty ( June 1994). "Kurt Cobain's death: MTV's Persian Gulf War". 'American Journalism Review, Vol. 16. Quote: "...police report details recited by anchor Kurt Loder in the first hours of coverage..."</ref> Loder authored a 1990 collection of his Rolling Stone work called Bat Chain Puller.

Loder has guest-starred as himself on Kenan & Kel, The "That '90s Show" episode of The Simpsons, Girlfriends, Duckman, Saturday Night Live, and Portlandia. He has appeared in several films. He was also parodied in the South Park episode "Timmy 2000".  

In 2011, St. Martin's Press published Loder's The Good, the Bad and the Godawful: 21st-Century Movie Reviews, which collected his film reviews from MTV.com and Reason.com.

In 2016, Loder began hosting the music-based radio talk show True Stories on SiriusXM.

Personal views

Politics
Loder identifies himself as a libertarian and summarizes his position as "free love and free markets". He called former New York City Mayor Michael Bloomberg "a scary guy" and called it "amazing that people don't rise up with pitchforks." Loder opposed President George H. W. Bush in the 1992 election and he believes that MTV News played a small role in Bush's loss. Loder believes that his views came from his childhood experiences, saying:

I grew up on the Jersey Shore, on a little barrier island. The Atlantic Ocean was on one side, the bay was on the other. Everyone there hunted and fished and clammed and got crabs out of the bay. And one day my brother told me someone had come down from the Bureau of Petty Harassment or something and they measured the temperature of the water and had decided it was a little too warm and a certain type of bacteria might incubate in it and there was a chance that might harm the clams. And so, from now on, no one was supposed to take clams out of the bay anymore. Which everyone ignored. And no one died. That was before the government got tenacious about this stuff. So I thought that was pretty stupid right there.

In a 1989 live show, Loder saw Skid Row front man Sebastian Bach wearing a T-shirt reading the anti-gay slogan "AIDS Kills Fags Dead." (a pun on the commercial slogan for Raid insecticide "Raid Kills Bugs Dead"). Loder reacted with an article in which he stated, "In the land of homophobia, if Axl Rose owns the restaurant and Public Enemy are the diners, we have a new busboy." Bach considered Loder's words "complete bullshit," saying that he had only used the shirt to dry himself off and strongly opposes the message on it, and later issued several public apologies.

Loder was highly critical of Michael Moore's documentary Sicko, saying it was "heavily doctored." He argued, "When governments attempt to regulate the balance between a limited supply of health care and an unlimited demand for it they're inevitably forced to ration treatment."

Media
Loder defines news as "anything that's interesting." He is critical of the idea of new journalism and argues that it has been used as a rhetorical shield for lazy journalism. He believes that new technology has fragmented American culture to the extent that no cinematic or musical success can unify it, as with past rock bands such as The Beatles. He also strongly supports copyright laws. He generally considers himself to be supportive of new media despite his role at MTV, once joking, "MTV is part of Viacom, which controls Paramount, and so on and so forth. It's the evil empire."

Loder's philosophy on the people he reports on is that:
You shouldn't make friends. It's not a good thing to be friends with people you're covering. There's just no point in doing it. It's tempting, but they're not going to consider you their friend anyway. They just know that you're somebody that can do something for them. So you shouldn't really flatter yourself that they want to be your buddy. They don't... They want you for some reason or other, and you just have to fend that off all the time. And you can't really cover people critically that you're friends with. How would that work? That would be bad. So you always have to keep that in mind.

References

External links
 
 Loder's MTV Biography
 
 
 Kurt Loder – Swindle Magazine

1945 births
American film critics
American libertarians
American music journalists
American television reporters and correspondents
American male non-fiction writers
Living people
United States Army soldiers
People from Ocean City, New Jersey
Rolling Stone people
MTV people